The Syriac Orthodox Monastery of Saint Mark (romanized: Dayrā dMār Marqus dSūrāyē) is a Syriac Orthodox monastery and church in the Old City of Jerusalem. According to a 6th-century inscription that was found at the Monastery of St Mark's in Jerusalem during a restoration in 1940, the church is supposed to have been built on the ancient site of the house of Mary, mother of St. Mark the Evangelist and the place of the Last Supper of Christ with His disciples. However, other Christians believe that the Last Supper was held at the nearby Cenacle on Mount Zion.

Inscription
"This is the house of Mary, mother of John, called Mark. Proclaimed a church by the holy apostles under the name of the Virgin Mary, mother of God, after the ascension of our Lord Jesus Christ into heaven. Renewed after the destruction of Jerusalem by Titus in the year A.D. 73."

History
There is a large collection of manuscripts written by various Holy fathers of Christianity like that of, Mor Kurillos, Patriarch of Alexandria who presided over the Council of Ephesus in AD 431; Mor Severious, Patriarch of Antioch (A.D 538);  Mor Gregorios Bar Ebroyo Maphriyono of the East (13th century);  Mor Dionysius;  Mor Chrysostom (4th century);  Mor Aphrem (AD 378); Mor Kuriakose, Patriarch of Antioch (AD 817); Mor Michael Rabo, Patriarch of Antioch (AD 1199) and others, in the monastery's famous library.

A piece of Holy Cross in which Lord Christ was crucified and relics of many Saints are preserved in this Monastery. Mary's baptismal basin, and an image of Virgin Mary painted by the apostle St. Luke can also be viewed in the Church.

History records that the site was visited by many ancient pilgrims from the West as well as the East, including the Bordeaux Pilgrim in 333 A.D., St. Cyril of Jerusalem in 348 A.D., and Saint Sylvia of Aquitaine in 385 A.D.

This is the center of the Syrian Orthodox (Assyrian-Syriac) community, which was established by the apostle St. Peter.  In the 6th century the community was persecuted and its leadership was later reestablished by Jacob Baradaeus; for this reason they are also known as “Jacobites.” After the Syriac Orthodox Church lost its other churches and properties in the Holy City, the Syriac Orthodox patriarch acquired the Monastery of Saint Mark from the Coptic Orthodox and it has served since as the seat of the Archbishop of Jerusalem. The first bishop known to have lived there is Ignatius III in the year 1471. The monastery was rebuilt a few times, by Metropolitan Gregorius Shem`un in 1718 and again by `Abdel Ahad Ben Fenah of Mardin in 1719 who also took care of restoring the manuscripts in the monastery's famous library. During the following century the monastery was restored at least five times, the last in 1858 after which it was left intact.

St. Mark’s monastery was rebuilt a few times: in 6th century AD,  1009, 1718, 1791, 1833, 1858, and in 1940.

Gallery

References 

 Bar-Am, Aviva: "Beyond the Walls: Churches of Jerusalem" (Ahva Press, 1998)
 Brownrigg, Ronald: "Come, See the Place: A Pilgrim Guide to the Holy Land" (Hodder and Stoughton, 1985)
 Freeman-Grenville, G. S. P.: "The Holy Land: A Pilgrim’s Guide to Israel, Jordan and the Sinai" (Continuum Publishing, 1996)
 Gonen, Rivka: "Biblical Holy Places: An illustrated guide" (Collier Macmillan, 1987)
 Hilliard, Alison, and Bailey, Betty Jane: "Living Stones Pilgrimage: With the Christians of the Holy Land" (Cassell, 1999)
 Murphy-O’Connor, Jerome: "The Holy Land: An Oxford Archaeological Guide from Earliest Times to 1700" (Oxford University Press, 2005)
 Prag, Kay: Jerusalem: "Blue Guide" (A. & C. Black, 1989)
 Shahin, Mariam, and Azar, George: "Palestine: A guide" (Chastleton Travel, 2005)
 Wareham, Norman, and Gill, Jill: "Every Pilgrim’s Guide to the Holy Land" (Canterbury Press, 1996)
 Meinardus, Otto: "The Syrian Jacobites in the Holy City" (Orientalia Suecana, 1963, pp. 12, 60-82)
 Syriac Peshitta Bible - the Bible in Aramaic, the language spoken by Jesus Christ

External links
 www.seetheholyland.net/st-marks-church/ 
 www.copticchurch.net
 www.coptic.net/EncyclopediaCoptica/

Syriac Orthodox churches in Jerusalem
Oriental Orthodox monasteries in Jerusalem